Grigory Yakovlevich Kriss (born 24 December 1940) is a retired Soviet Olympic épée fencer who won four Olympic medals.

Early life
Kriss was born in Kiev, Ukraine, and is Jewish. He was an officer in the Red Army of the Soviet Union.

Fencing career
He competed at the 1964 Olympics winning a gold medal in Individual Epee, the 1968 Olympics winning silver medals in both Individual Epee and Team Epee, and the 1972 Olympics winning a bronze medal in Team Epee.

At the World Championships he won the Individual Epee silver medal in 1967, the Individual Epee gold medal in 1971, and four World Team Epee medals: a bronze in 1965, a silver in 1966, a gold in 1969, and a silver in 1971.

Hall of Fame
Kriss was inducted into the International Jewish Sports Hall of Fame in 1989.

Life outside competitive fencing
He was a physical education teacher, and a fencing coach.

See also
List of select Jewish fencers

References

External links

Jewish Sports Legends bio

Ukrainian male épée fencers
Soviet male épée fencers
Olympic fencers of the Soviet Union
Fencers at the 1964 Summer Olympics
Fencers at the 1968 Summer Olympics
Fencers at the 1972 Summer Olympics
Olympic gold medalists for the Soviet Union
Olympic silver medalists for the Soviet Union
Olympic bronze medalists for the Soviet Union
Olympic medalists in fencing
Jewish male épée fencers
1940 births
Living people
Sportspeople from Kyiv
Jewish Ukrainian sportspeople
Armed Forces sports society athletes
International Jewish Sports Hall of Fame inductees
Medalists at the 1964 Summer Olympics
Medalists at the 1968 Summer Olympics
Medalists at the 1972 Summer Olympics